The Canon de 105 mle 1913 Schneider was a French artillery piece used in World War I and World War II by many European countries.

History 
In the early 1900s, the French company Schneider began a collaboration with the Russian company Putilov. For this collaboration, it had developed a gun using the Russian 107 mm round, which was ordered by the Russian Army to be produced in Russia (though the initial batch of guns was made in France). Schneider then decided to modify the design for the French 105 mm (4.134 inches) round and offer it to France as well. Initially, the French army was not interested in this weapon as they already had plenty of 75 mm field guns. However, in 1913, the French army purchased a small number under the designation Canon de 105 mle 1913 Schneider; it was also known by the service designation L 13 S.

After the end of World War I, France sold or gave many Schneider 105 mm guns to various other countries, including Belgium, Italy, Poland, and Yugoslavia. In Italy, the 105 mm was re-designated the Cannone da 105/28 and saw service until 1943. Guns were also produced under license in Italy, starting from September 1914, by Ansaldo.   Poland also used new model of Schneider's gun with a longer barrel and split trail, called the wz. 29, which was in fact a completely different weapon; both were in service at the beginning of WW II in 1939. In 1939 Poland had 118 of wz. 13 guns and 124 of wz. 29 guns, used in Heavy Artillery Detachments.

The German conquests of Poland, Belgium, France, and Yugoslavia during World War II gave them large numbers of captured 105 mm Schneider guns. 854 L 13 S's were in service in France and a large number were captured. Many of these were installed in the Atlantic Wall system of coastal defenses.

Finland was able to buy 12 of these guns from France during the Winter War; they also rebarreled six Russian 107mm Schnieders (four 1910 and two 1913 models) to 105mm. In addition, they were able to purchase 54 captured Polish Armata 105 mm wz. 29 Schneider guns from Germany.

Designations 

Because the gun was used by many countries, it had many official designations.

 Canon de 105 mle 1913 Schneider - French designation
 105 L - designation by French army during World War I
 The Italian designation was Cannone da 105/28 modello 1913, often shortened to Cannone da 105/28
 105 mm armata wz. 13  and 105 mm armata dalekonośna wz. 29  were Polish designations for the original gun and a modernised version respectively
 German designations include:
 10.5 cm K 331(f) for guns captured from France
 10.5 cm K 333(b) for guns captured from Belgium
 10.5 cm K 338(i) for guns captured from Italy
 10.5 cm K 338(j) for guns captured from Yugoslavia
 10.5 cm K 13(p) and 10.5 cm K 29(p) for guns captured from Poland
 105 K/13, 105 K/10 and 105 K/29 were the Finnish designations for the guns. 105 K/13 was the original French Gun, 105 K/10 was the 107mm Russian Gun rebarrelled to 105mm, while 105 K/29 were Polish 105 mm wz. 29 Schneider guns (These were captured guns which had been sold to Finland by Germany).

References 

 Artillery by Chris Chant, pages 31, 50-51.

External links 

 Cannone da 105/28 on Italian Army website
 Comando Supremo
 Flames of war
 List and pictures of World War I surviving 105 Mle 1913 Schneider guns

 

World War I artillery of Italy
World War II artillery of Italy
World War I guns
World War I field artillery of France
World War II weapons of France
105 mm artillery
Schneider Electric